Cidimar Aparecido Ernegas (born 1 March 1975), commonly known as Alemão, is a Brazilian professional football manager and former player who played as a defensive midfielder.

Playing career
Born in Curitiba but raised in Nova Esperança, Alemão finished his formation with Londrina. He was promoted to the first team in 1994, being transferred to XV de Piracicaba in the following year.

Alemão subsequently represented Ituano, União Barbarense, Brasil de Pelotas, Caldense, Paulista, Paysandu, Ulbra, J. Malucelli and Adap Galo Maringá, aside from two spells back at his first side Londrina and a short stint at Italy's Monza in 2002. He retired with Adap in 2008, aged 33.

Managerial career
Alemão began his managerial career with his Junior Team's youth setup in 2009, being in charge of the club's under-15 and under-17 squads. He subsequently worked for six years as a technical advisor at the Fundação de Esportes de Londrina and as manager of Colégio Marista’s futsal youth team, before returning to Londrina in 2017, as a manager of the under-17s.

Alemão was promoted to the under-19 squad for the 2018 season, and achieved an impressive run of 19 matches undefeated. On 19 November 2018, he replaced Roberto Fonseca as manager of the main squad for the 2019 Campeonato Paranaense. Alemão was named assistant as Fonseca returned to the club in April 2019, but was again appointed manager shortly after, due to Fonseca's resignation.

Alemão was sacked on 21 August 2019, but returned to the role for the 2020 campaign.

Honours

Player
XV de Piracicaba
 Campeonato Brasileiro Série C: 1995

References

External links
 

1975 births
Living people
Footballers from Curitiba
Brazilian footballers
Brazilian football managers
Association football midfielders
Brazilian expatriate footballers
Brazilian expatriate sportspeople in Italy
Expatriate footballers in Italy
Campeonato Brasileiro Série B players
Campeonato Brasileiro Série C players
Campeonato Brasileiro Série B managers
Brazil under-20 international footballers
Londrina Esporte Clube players
Esporte Clube XV de Novembro (Piracicaba) players
Ituano FC players
União Agrícola Barbarense Futebol Clube players
Grêmio Esportivo Brasil players
Associação Atlética Caldense players
A.C. Monza players
Paulista Futebol Clube players
Paysandu Sport Club players
Canoas Sport Club players
J. Malucelli Futebol players
Adap Galo Maringá Football Club players
Londrina Esporte Clube managers